Henry Cyril Casserley (12 June 1903 – 16 December 1991) was a British railway photographer. His prolific work in the 1920s and 1930s, the result of travelling to remote corners of the railway network in the United Kingdom and Ireland, has provided subsequent generations with a valuable source of illustrations for books and magazines.

Life
Henry Cyril Casserley was born in Clapham, County of London, the son of Edward Casserley, a minor Post Office official, and his wife Sarah (née Turton). Edward Casserley loved mechanical objects and constructed from scratch a model railway in the loft, which may have inspired his son's enthusiasm for trains. Henry spent his working life in the head offices of the Prudential Assurance Company in London (evacuated to Derby in World War 2). He married Kathleen Goose on 16 July 1931. Their son Richard, (31 December 1936 - 18 October 2017), who also took up photography and latterly acted as custodian of his father's collection.

The family lived beside the railway line just east of Bromley South railway station from 1931 to 1939 but moved to a house on a new estate at Berkhamsted, Hertfordshire, because the electrification of the Southern Railway greatly reduced the number of steam trains passing Bromley. Casserley acquired his first motor car in 1934, which aided his reaching obscure small railway lines and investigating windmills, in which he had also developed an interest.

He was in military service from 1942 to 1944, mostly based in the Army stores section at Bicester, but was invalided out and returned to his job at the Prudential. He retired in 1964 and devoted himself to his 'second career' as photographer and writer. His wife died in 1986 and his interest and memory then declined until his death, aged 88 in Berkhampsted.

Photography
H. C. Casserley's first camera was a Kodak no.2 folding Brownie with f/8 Rapid rectilinear lens acquired in 1919, but this was soon replaced by a professional standard Butcher's 'Popular Pressman' quarter-plate reflex camera (using 4¼" x 3¼" glass plates). In 1937 he replaced it with one of the new Leica 35 mm cameras, which was much more convenient and served him until the end of his career, being replaced with an identical model when the original was stolen in 1963.

Despite a few experiments with early commercial colour film, he remained committed to the black-and-white medium to the end and always did his own processing and printing. He was meticulous in keeping records of his negatives, using a numbering system he later shared with his son, and estimated that he had personally taken 60,000 railway subjects by 1972, in some fifty-two years of work.

He started by recording locomotives, usually 'on shed' because of the bulk of his camera and the slow film speeds, but he expanded his range to cover scenes in and around stations as his desire to travel over all lines of railway in the British Isles took him to obscure corners of the railway system. There are many characteristic broadside shots of Southern Railway locos 'at the bottom of the garden' in Bromley in the 1930s, but generally he had little time for the scenic movement in railway photography, being strictly a 'photographer of record'. He largely stopped photographing railways with the end of steam traction on British Railways and Córas Iompair Éireann.

Publication
Casserley began contributing articles on railway and travel subjects from 1919, but was soon better known for supplying photographs to The Railway Magazine and enthusiast society journals. An early success was to obtain the first photograph of Midland Railway 0-10-0 banker locomotive 2290 in steam, at Derby in January 1920.

Before retirement he wrote or compiled only a few books, including the self-published Locomotive cavalcade (1952), and editions of The Observer's Book of Railway Locomotives of Britain for Frederick Warne & Co. From 1964 to 1979 he put together more than 20 titles, mostly collections of photographs (usually his own), for specialist transport publishers David & Charles, Ian Allan and D. Bradford Barton.

Bibliography of major book publications
 Veterans of the track, Ian Allan, 1946
 Locomotive cavalcade, H. C. Casserley, 1952
 (ed.) Service suspended, Ian Allan, [1951]
 (with Leslie Lewis Asher) Locomotives of British Railways, 4 vols, Dakers, 1955
 The Observer's Book of Railway Locomotives of Britain, 5 editions, F. Warne, 1955–1966 (and subsequent 'historic' reprints)
 The historic locomotive pocketbook: from the ’Rocket’ to the end of steam, Batsford, 1960
 Steam locomotives of British Railways, 3 editions, Hamlyn, 1961–1973 (with assistance from Leslie Lewis Asher, based on the 1955 Dakers publication)
 (with S. W. Johnston) Locomotives at the Grouping, 4 vols, Ian Allan, 1966
 1: Southern Railway [1974 paperback edition ]
 2: London & North Eastern Railway [1974 paperback edition ]
 3: London Midland & Scottish Railway [1974 paperback edition ]
 4: Great Western Railway [1974 paperback edition ]
 British locomotive names of the twentieth century, Rev. ed., Ian Allan, 1967
 Midland album, Ian Allan, 1967
 Britain's joint lines, Ian Allan, 1968
 Preserved locomotives, 5 editions, Ian Allan, 1968–1980
 (with C. C. Dorman) The Midlands, (Railway history in pictures series), David and Charles, 1969, 
 London and South Western locomotives (incorporating F. Burtt: LSWR Locomotives: a survey 1873–1922, published 1949) Ian Allan, 1971
 Railways between the wars, David and Charles, 1971, 
 H. C. Casserley (Famous railway photographers series), David and Charles, 1972, 
 Railways since 1939, David and Charles, 1972, 
 Outline of Irish railway history, David and Charles, 1974, 
 LMSR steam, 1923–1948, D. Bradford Barton, 1975, 
 Wessex (Railway history in pictures series), David and Charles, 1975, 
 The Lickey Incline (Locomotion papers, 91), Oakwood Press, 1976
 LMSR locomotives, 1923–1948 (three vols), D. Bradford Barton, 1976
 Recollections of the Southern between the wars, D. Bradford Barton, 1976, 
 LNER locomotives, 1923–1948, D. Bradford Barton, 1977, 
 LNER steam, 1923–1948, D. Bradford Barton, 1977, 
 Irish railways in the heyday of steam, D. Bradford Barton, 1979, 
 (ed.) The later years of Metropolitan steam, D. Bradford Barton, [1979?], 
 Light railways of Britain : standard gauge and narrow gauge, D. Bradford Barton, 1979, 
 Scottish railways in the heyday of steam, D. Bradford Barton, 1979, 
 Welsh railways in the heyday of steam, D. Bradford Barton, 1979,

References

External links
 H. C. Casserley at SteamIndex.com
 Railway Photographers (steamindex.com)
  "A return trip to Burtonport" by H C Casserley– Article about a journey on the Londonderry and Lough Swilly Railway from The Railway Magazine, May 1938, with photos taken on the trip.

1903 births
1991 deaths
People from Clapham
Photographers from London
Rail transport photographers
British railway artists
Rail transport writers